is a Japanese manga written and illustrated by Yama Wayama. Originally written as a doujinshi (self-published manga) in February 2019, the manga was later acquired by the Comic Beam editorial department, who published the manga in one volume in August 2019. A television drama adaptation aired from January to February 2021.

Synopsis
Captivated, by You is an anthology series of loosely-connected stories about students at an all-boys school. Several of the stories focus on Hayashi, an aloof and forthright student, while others focus on Nikaidou, a student who has adopted a downcast and grim persona to avoid becoming close to his classmates.

Media

Manga
It was later acquired by the Comic Beam editorial department, who published the manga in one tankōbon volume on August 10, 2019.

In January 2021, Yen Press announced they licensed the series for English publication. They released the volume on July 27, 2021.

Live-action
A live-action television drama adaptation aired on MBS TV and TV Kanagawa from January 8 to February 5, 2021. It was directed by Ayuko Tsukuhara, Eiji Takano, and Moeka Miyazaki, with scripts written by Kōhei Kiyasu and Manato Hamada. Ryusei Onishi of Naniwa Danshi performed the lead role.

Reception
In the 2020 edition of the Kono Manga ga Sugoi! guidebook's top manga for female readers, the manga ranked second. The manga was also nominated for the 13th Manga Taishō in 2020. At the 2020 Japan Media Arts Festival, the manga won the New Face Award in the manga division. The manga also won the Short Work Prize in the 2020 Tezuka Osamu Cultural Prize.

Rebecca Silverman from Anime News Network praised the depiction of high school and artistic details of Nikaidou, while also feeling that it was too odd at points. Sara Smith from School Library Journal also praised the characters and their designs.

References

External links
 

2019 manga
Doujinshi
Enterbrain manga
Manga adapted into television series
School life in anime and manga
Winner of Tezuka Osamu Cultural Prize (Short Story Award)
Yen Press titles